TCT may refer to:

Science and technology
 Teenage Cancer Trust, a British charity organization
 Thrombin clotting time, a test used in blood coagulation
 Tocotrienol, a group of four isomers occurring in Vitamin E
 True crystallization temperature, the temperature at which salt crystals begin to crystallize from a solution
 The Coroner's Toolkit, a suite of computer forensic software
 Tungsten carbide-tipped, hardened metal used for example in an annular cutter or drill bit
 TCT, a codon for the amino acid Serine

Transportation
 Tate's Cairn Tunnel, a Hong Kong tunnel
 Texas City Terminal Railway, a 32-mile-long railroad
 Trans Canada Trail, a proposed trail that would stretch across Canada
 Tung Chung Terminal, a Hong Kong gondola lift station of Ngong Ping 360

Arts and media
 The Catholic Transcript, a Catholic paper in Hartford, Connecticut, United States
 The Catholic Thing, a Catholic online publication
 TCT (band), a Finnish band
 Tri-State Christian Television, a Christian cable television network broadcasting in the US and Canada (formerly known as Total Christian Television)

Other uses
 Touring Club de Tunisie, a member of the Fédération Internationale de l'Automobile